Bucket List Project is the debut studio album by American rapper Saba. It was released on October 27, 2016  by Saba Pivot, LLC.

Background
The album was produced mainly by Saba himself and Phoelix, with guest producers ranging from Cam O'bi, daedaePIVOT, Joseph Chilliams, Ken Ross, Flex Lennon, squeakPIVOT, among others. The album also includes guest appearances from Noname, Twista, Smino, Ravyn Lenae, and Jean Deaux, among others.

Critical reception 

Bucket List Project received critical acclaim from critics. Pitchfork wrote "it is superbly written and performed. Saba is a crafty storyteller who makes full use of his long memory and slithering wordplay." Finishing 12th on Rolling Stone's list of 40 Best Rap Albums of 2016, Saba "successfully mashes of-the-moment hip-hop and atmospheric, live-band funk textures." Consequence of Sound compared Bucket List Project to Kendrick Lamar, writing "Saba maintained a precocious mastery of his craft with windingly poetic flows over murky, subdued beats, not too far removed from Kendrick Lamar circa Section 80."

Track listing

Track notes
  signifies an additional producer
 "In Loving Memory" and "American Hypnosis" features additional vocals from Daoud.
 "Stoney" features additional vocals from BRJKNC.
 "GPS" features uncredited vocals from Chandlar and BJRKNC.
 "Church (Liquor Store)" features additional vocals from Akenya.
 "Symmetry" and "Photosynthesis" features additional vocals from Phoelix.

Personnel
Credits are adapted from the rapper's official Soundcloud page.

Vocalists
 Saba - primary artist
 Phoelix - featured artist , background artist 
 BJRKNC - featured artist , background artist 
 Twista - featured artist 
 Noname - featured artist 
 Joseph Chilliams - featured artist 
 Jean Deaux - featured artist 
 Matthew Santos - featured artist 
 Akenya - featured artist , background artist 
 Ravyn Lenae - featured artist 
 Smino - featured artist 
 LEGIT - featured artist 
 Daoud - background artist 
 Chandlar - background artist 

Musicians
 Herbie One - trumpet 
 Simon Dufor - sax 
 Benjamin J Shepherd - additional bass 
 Jameson Brenner - guitar 

Technical
 Matt Wheeler - mixing, mastering 
 Elton "L10" Chueng - mixing 
 Matt Wheeler - mastering 
 James Musshorn - recording 
 Cornell "MixedbyCJ" Smith - recording 
 Elton "L10" Chueng - vocal engineer 
 Cameron Boswell - vocal engineer 

Production
 Phoelix - production 
 Saba - production 
 Daoud - production 
 L Boog - production 
 Cam O'bi - production 
 Joseph Chilliams - production 
 daedaePIVOT - production 
 Ken Ross - production 
 Flex Lennon - production 
 squeakPIVOT - production 
 Cory Grindberg - production 
 D. Phelps - production 
 Monte Booker - production

References

2016 albums
Saba (rapper) albums
Midwest hip hop albums
Albums free for download by copyright owner